The Metropolitan Adelaide Transport Study, or "MATS Plan" as it became known, was a comprehensive transport plan released in 1968 proposing a number of road and rail transport projects for the metropolitan area of Adelaide, South Australia.

It recommended the construction of 98 kilometres of freeways, 34 kilometres of expressway and the widening of 386 kilometres of existing arterial roads. It also featured new arterial roads and a new bridge over the Port River. For public transport, it proposed the closure of the Glenelg tram line, 20 rail grade separations and 14 kilometres of new train line, including a subway under King William Street.

The estimated cost of land acquisition and construction was $436.5 million in 1968, which equates to approximately $4,580 million in 2010 with inflation. Very few of the plan's recommendations were ultimately brought to fruition in their original form due to political and public opposition.

History
Like other states of Australia, there was a strong movement towards private car travel following World War II in South Australia. Fuel rationing was a thing of the past and private car ownership was increasing. The car was seen as a personal liberator following the constraints of the wartime periods, with many cities around the world building their urban forms around the needs of private cars.

Adelaide continued to expand rapidly due to people continuing to choose to live in suburbs as well as population growth and by 1966, Adelaide's population had increased by 90% on post war levels. Experts had been warning of the consequences of unplanned urban sprawl leading to a renewed interest in planning. In 1955 the Town Planning Act was amended to make a requirement for a coordinated plan to guide the future development of Adelaide.

The Report of Metropolitan Adelaide was released in 1962 and featured proposals for the construction of freeways. In 1964 the state Liberal and Country League Premier Thomas Playford announced the commencement of a comprehensive infrastructure planning study for the future of Adelaide's transport needs. This report, titled the Metropolitan Adelaide Transportation Study (MATS) was released in August 1968 together with an announcement that six months would be allowed for public comment before commencement of work.

Recommended freeways

North-South Freeway 

The North-South Freeway was one of the most important parts of the plan, allowing travel north and south of Adelaide. The Report on the Metropolitan Area of Adelaide predicted that the city would eventually stretch more than 70 km, from Elizabeth in the north to Sellicks Beach in the south by the 1980s.

Travel from Salisbury to Noarlunga was estimated to take approximately 30 minutes. The freeway consisted of two sections: the Noarlunga Freeway and the Salisbury Freeway. The Noarlunga freeway would serve the rapidly growing residential, industrial and recreational to the south connecting to major highways to Victor Harbor and Yankalilla.

Starting at Old Noarlunga, it was to follow a path adjacent to Main South Road (this has since been completed and is known as the Southern Expressway), then continuing north on a path roughly parallel to South Road then land near the west parkland with off ramps to the CBD, until joining the North Adelaide Connector. An interchange north of the Anzac Highway would connect it to the proposed Glenelg Expressway that would have replaced the Glenelg tram line.

The Salisbury Freeway was the six-lane continuation of the Noarlunga Freeway starting at the Hindmarsh Interchange then roughly followed the west of the Gawler railway line through Wingfield and north to Edinburgh. The Noarlunga Freeway was proposed to be eight lanes, cost $34 million in land acquisition, $58 million in construction and carry 93,000 cars on an average weekday by 1986.

Main North Road comparably carries approximately 46,000 cars on an average weekday in 2007. The Mitchell and Kwinana Freeways in Perth forming a north–south freeway present a comparable example to the proposed North-South Freeway in Adelaide.

Port Freeway 
This was to be a freeway constructed in the wide median strip of Port Road that had been left in earlier years for a possible canal leading from Port Adelaide to the Adelaide city centre. It was to go from the Hindmarsh Interchange to the Old Port Road intersection. It would feature pedestrian overpasses but was still criticised for blocking communications across Port Road. Following Port Road, Commercial Road was to continue over a new bridge over the Port River connecting to Victoria Road making a continuous arterial road.

Hindmarsh Interchange 
The largest construction project in the plan. The intersection of the Port Freeway, North-South Freeway and North Adelaide Connector would have required a four-level spaghetti interchange with many flyovers that would have almost engulfed the suburb of Hindmarsh. Pictures of similar sized interchanges in Los Angeles were used to good effect by opponents of MATS. There were four different designs proposed including one that was to be sited in the parklands, reducing the need for land acquisition.

North Adelaide Connector 
This was to connect the western and eastern sides of the city starting from the Hindmarsh Interchange and connecting to the Modbury Freeway. It would have been constructed through parkland and travel partially underground to reduce the loss of open space.

Arterial road projects have since taken place in the area, particularly on roads lining the parklands including Park Terrace, Fitzroy Terrace and Park Road. Overpasses were constructed to carry Park Terrace over the Gawler railway line in 1990 and the Outer Harbor railway line in 2017.

The Hawker Street tram bridge over the Gawler railway line was demolished in the 1970s due to lack of maintenance and safety concerns. An overpass over the Gawler railway line at Torrens Road was proposed but a report on the Torrens Road upgrade in 2005 stated grade separation was no longer a priority. A Torrens Road bridge over the Gawler railway line was constructed in 2021–2022 and allowed traffic from 18 June 2022, eliminating the level crossing.

Hills Freeway 

This was proposed to be a connection between the new South Eastern Freeway (then under construction from Crafers, leaving the winding old road down to the plains) and the CBD. It would have cut a swathe through College Park, St Peters, Norwood, Rose Park, Myrtle Bank and Urrbrae before leaving the city at Belair Road. Many of Adelaide's most affluent suburbs would have been broken up. This proved to be the most controversial part of the entire MATS plan. It was dropped from subsequent proposals but served to turn public opinion against the rest of the project.

Foothills Expressway 
A proposed link between the North-South Freeway at Darlington (approximately the point where South Road meets Sturt Road) travelling in a north-east direction to meet up with the Hills Freeway at Belair Road. The expressway was scrapped from subsequent proposals with the Hills Freeway.

Modbury Freeway 
Starting at the North Adelaide Connector, this would have followed the River Torrens (the O-Bahn Busway was later constructed in this corridor instead). At approximately 1 km from the O-Bahn's current terminus in Modbury, it would have then turned further north along what is now McIntyre Road through Golden Grove.

An express bus service along the freeway giving a similar service to the current O-Bahn was proposed. The freeway would have required the relocation of the River Torrens in various sections.

Dry Creek Expressway 
Starting at Port Adelaide, this would have been an east–west connector running roughly parallel to and slightly north of Grand Junction Road and terminating at the Modbury Freeway. The section west of Main North Road has been completed since as the Port River Expressway. However it has not been extended eastward, the original corridor now utilised as Montague Road.

Public transport changes
There were various changes to public transport proposed. While the report stated that it was important in directing and shaping urban growth and improving the Adelaide city centre, only 14 kilometres of new railway was proposed compared to 131 kilometres of freeway. The only remaining part of the Adelaide tram network, the Glenelg tram, was also to be removed in favour of an expressway.

Train
The existing rail system was to be turned into a rapid rail network which would be aimed at providing efficient long distance, high speed suburban transport. Many railway stations were to be rationalised and some would be relocated to link to main roads. Closure of some stations allowed higher running speeds of trains and reduced running and maintenance costs.

Locating stations closer to main roads made them more accessible and visible. Railway stations would be supported by feeder bus services thereby increasing their serviceable range. Competing bus services were to be removed. A distance of 3.2 kilometres between railway stations was said to be optimal.

The Noarlunga rail line, which then only went as far as Hallett Cove, was to be extended to Christie Downs.

King William Street subway
The most significant proposed public transport project was an underground railway beneath the city to bring rail to the core of the CBD. It was to link the main north–south Gawler and Noarlunga lines with a new arrangement of through-stations. This would have eliminated the limitations in service-frequency in railways with a central terminus. After skirting underground to the north of the Adelaide railway station, the subway was to proceed under the central King William Street and serve it with three stations, before returning to the surface just south of Greenhill Road where it is crossed by the current Glenelg tram line. The envisioned closure of the latter would have allowed its corridor to be used by the new railway instead, until Glandore, although options to accommodate four tracks and both services in this section of corridor could have existed. From Glandore, the new railway would have rejoined the existing Noarlunga Line at Edwardstown via an approximately 1,200m-long new railway corridor running parallel to South Road and about 200m to its west.

Apart from the direct public transport benefits, it was said the subway would also lead to increased land values and encourage development at the southern end of the city. The Toronto Yonge Street subway was used as an example. Furthermore, the heritage Adelaide railway station and much of the Adelaide rail yards would have become available for value capture property development.

The subway was estimated to cost $32 million. Construction costs were to be reduced by using a cut and cover construction technique involving the temporary removal of King William Street.

Tram
The report recommended the closure of the Glenelg tram line and its replacement with the Glenelg Expressway. The report stated that significant investment would be required to integrate the tram line with the proposed new rapid transit rail system and to construct grade separations along existing roads. Based on those assumptions, it recommended that the continued operation of the tram would not be cost-effective.

It was predicted that overall public transport usage would fall to below 5% by around the year 2000, and proceeding with the recommended changes would maintain the number at 7%.

Reaction and opposition
The Report on the Metropolitan Area of Adelaide 1962 had contained images of the city of Los Angeles, and its extensive freeways, to represent a potential model for Adelaide's future transport provision. However, in concert with changing community attitudes in Australia in the late 1960s, many South Australians were cautious about the MATS proposal for the construction of a large freeway network. Opposition was similar to the freeway and expressway revolts experienced in the United States.

Large-scale property acquisition proved to be one of the most contentious issues, with the very large areas taken up by a number of the proposed freeway interchanges seemingly recommended without any expectation of opposition. The Noarlunga Freeway alone would have required the acquisition as many as 3,000 properties, including 817 residential dwellings. The Hills Freeway would have seen the demolition of significant areas in the historic suburbs of inner south-eastern Adelaide.

The impact of freeways on the urban landscape also proved to be a considerable source of concern. It was feared freeways would create social problems, with people noting the urban divisions that cities such as Los Angeles experienced after extensive freeway construction, with the separation of neighbourhoods leading to the creation of urban ghettos. It was felt that the same would happen in Adelaide if the proposed freeways were constructed.

Implementation
In 1969 the State Cabinet with the Liberal and Country League as government and Steele Hall as premier approved the MATS Plan excluding some proposals which were to be further reviewed including:
 Closure of the Grange Railway line
 Foothills Expressway and Hills Freeway
 Selections of the Modbury, Noarlunga Freeways and Dry Creek Expressway
 Rerouting railway from Edwardstown to Goodwood

Abandonment
In 1970 a new Labor government under Don Dunstan was elected and shelved MATS, but did not go as far as selling the corridors already acquired. However, the Adelaide Festival Centre was developed over the optimal portal location for the proposed King William Street subway. Dunstan resisted urban sprawl, but initiated the ill-fated concept of the Monarto satellite city, as well as investigating new technologies in public transport. Dunstan attempted to construct a light rail line in the north-east along the Modbury corridor. That was not built, and the O-Bahn bus route was constructed instead.

In 1980, the Liberal Party won government on a platform of fiscal conservatism and the premier David Tonkin committed his government to selling off the land acquired for the MATS plan, ensuring that even if needs or public opinion changed, the construction of most MATS-proposed freeways would be impossible. However, debate continued on a North-South Freeway to replace South Road. In 1982, the Minister for Transport Michael Wilson, abandoned the idea of a high-speed freeway and instead began widening South Road between Torrens Road and Daws Road as a short-term solution, while retaining the key central portion of the North-South Corridor between Dry Creek and Darlington as a concept.

In June 1983, the North-South Corridor, the last surviving element of MATS, was completely abandoned by John Bannon's new Labor government, which cited land sales as the reason. The abandonment had a significant impact on the Highways Department, because it was the first time in its history that a government had rejected the recommendations of the Commissioner.

Post-abandonment assessment 
Attitudes towards MATS in the present day are mixed. The then premier Steele Hall still believed abandoning the plan was a severe mistake and has continued to push for the plan to be implemented. Freight transport and motoring lobbies generally favoured the plan heavily and, periodically, refer to the rejection of the MATS plan as a lost opportunity. Major road lobby groups as of 2007 continue to call for a north–south freeway in particular with the State Government joining calls for funding under the Federal Government's AusLink Program.

Public transport activists criticised the plan due to its limited benefits for public transport and the potential effects on urban sprawl. Others believe varying degrees of the plan were too ruthless towards the environment and would have ruined the character of Adelaide.

Present-day 
Some roads constructed since MATS are reminiscent of the original proposed freeways in MATS due to Adelaide's inherent transport pressures. The Southern Expressway was constructed partly following the southern section of the proposed Noarlunga Freeway; it remained viable to construct as much land remained undeveloped. The South Eastern Freeway, which had started early construction at the time of MATS, was completed in 1979 from Crafers to Murray Bridge with the final link from Crafers to Adelaide constructed from 1996 to 2000. The Port River Expressway was opened in 2005 and partially follows the original Dry Creek Expressway proposed by MATS but does not extend eastwards to Modbury.

The Rann Labor government stated it believed South Road should be upgraded into a non stop north–south route, but declined a 2007 $1bn pre-election funding offer from the then Howard Federal Government which would have upgraded substantial sections of the road. Instead, construction of an underpass at the intersection of South Road and the Anzac Highway began in 2007 and was completed in 2009. MATS' proposed North-South Freeway began to see fruition when the South Road Superway became the first in a series of mass construction projects to build the non-stop North–South Motorway to replace South Road; as of March 2020 approximately 24.3 km of the motorway has been completed from Hindmarsh to Virginia with a 1.8 km link within that length due for completion in 2022. The remaining 10 km through Adelaide's inner west and south-west is currently in the planning stages, due for completion in 2032.

See also
 Transport in Adelaide
 State Transport Authority
 Railways in Adelaide
 Freeways in Australia
 South Eastern Freeway
 South Road
 History of Adelaide

Melbourne:
 1969 Melbourne Transportation Plan

Hobart:
 Hobart Area Transportation Study

References

Bibliography
 De Leuw. Cather & Company. Rankine & Hill Alan M. Voorhees & Associates, 1968, Metropolitan Adelaide Transport Study 1968, Adelaide
 The University of Adelaide Department of Adult Education, the Metropolitan Adelaide Transportation Study and the Future Development of Adelaide, 1968, Adelaide
 Thomas Wilson, The Relationship Between a Transport Link and Land Use Development between Adelaide and Port Adelaide South Australia, Adelaide
 J.C. Radcliff. C.J.M. Steele, Adelaide Road Passenger Transport 1836–1958, Libraries Board of South Australia, Adelaide, 1974

External links 
 Atlas of South Australia – The course of settlement

Proposed transport infrastructure in Australia
History of Adelaide
Freeways and highways in Adelaide
Government reports
Politics of South Australia
1968 documents
1968 in law
1968 in Australia